Adamstown is a suburb of Newcastle, New South Wales, Australia, located  from Newcastle's central business district. It is split between the City of Newcastle and City of Lake Macquarie local government areas.

History 
The Aboriginal people, in this area, the Awabakal, were the first people of this land.

Adamstown officially became a suburb in 1885 and the first council was elected in 1886 with the council chambers being completed in 1892. In 1938 Adamstown merged into other local council areas to become the areas of Greater Newcastle.

The Adamstown railway station opened in 1887 with the Newcastle–Gosford section of the Main North line. The now closed branch line to Belmont formerly left the main line just south of Adamstown Station. The town also includes the beginning of the Fernleigh Track, a multi-use rail trail near Belmont. The project is a joint venture between Newcastle City Council and Lake Macquarie City Council and extends from Adamstown to Belmont over an approximate distance of 15.5 km (10 mi).

Population
According to the 2016 census of Population, there were 6,044 people in Adamstown.
 Aboriginal and Torres Strait Islander people made up 2.7% of the population. 
 85.5% of people were born in Australia. The next most common country of birth was England at 2.1%.   
 89.5% of people only spoke English at home. 
 The most common responses for religion were No Religion 33.8%, Catholic 26.7% and Anglican 15.7%.

Education
A number of schools are located in the suburb: 
 St Pius X High School (Years 7–10), first established in 1957 and became co-educational in 1983, absorbing the campus of St Anne's College, a girls' school established in 1966. Students transfer in year 11 to St Francis Xavier's College, Hamilton. In 2007, the school had an enrolment of 1,010 and a staff of 97.
 Adamstown Primary School and St Columba's Primary School are also located within the suburb's boundaries.

Community support

Adamstown has a range of community support organisations. These include St Columbas Catholic Church and the Returned Serviceman's League sub-branch that is part of the Adamstown Community Club.

The Adamstown Rosebud Football club is arguably the most famous club in Northern NSW Football, having produced 16 Socceroos including Ray Baartz and Col Curran among others.

The club is also one of the oldest football clubs in Australia, having formed in 1889.

The club still plays out of Adamstown Oval, the original home ground from the club's inaugural season.

References

Suburbs of Newcastle, New South Wales